Campbell Farm or Campbell Farm Site may refer to:

(by state, then town/city)
Campbell Farm Site (Campbell, Michigan), listed on the National Register of Historic Places (NRHP) in Cheboygan County
Campbell-De Young Farm, Elmwood Charter Township, Michigan, listed on the NRHP in Leelanau County
Thompson-Campbell Farmstead, Langdon, Missouri, listed on the NRHP in Atchison County
Campbell Farm (Edinburg, Virginia), listed on the NRHP in Shenandoah County

See also
Campbell House (disambiguation)